Cherry Bowl Drive-In Theatre & Diner is a historic drive-in theater and diner in Honor, Michigan on US Highway 31 (US 31). It opened on July 4, 1953. and was one of seven remaining drive-in theaters in Michigan in 2003. It has a snack bar, children's play areas, putt-putt golf, beach volleyball, and a rest area for dogs. The Cherry Bowl is the only remaining drive-in theater in Northern Michigan. The Cherry Bowl's sound system uses the original vacuum tube motiograph amplifiers  powering speakers at speaker posts. An FM radio option is also offered. The drive-in theatre is open in the summertime. The Cherry Bowl has converted to digital HD projection.
 
Then-Governor Jennifer Granholm told the Detroit Free Press in 2009 that residents "haven't lived in Michigan until '[they've] been to the old-fashioned Cherry Bowl Drive-in in Benzie County, where [they] can sit on cushions in the back of [their] truck on a warm night, munching on the best movie popcorn and chicken fingers in Michigan watching an evening summer movie." In 2013, Honda awarded the theatre a prize in its "Project Drive-In" social media campaign; the car maker awarded the Cherry Bowl a new digital projector. The theater and drive-in are located at 9812 Honor Highway (US 31).

History
The Cherry Bowl opened on July 4, 1953.  Longtime owner Jean Griffin ran the business after her husband's death in 1959, and was known for working in high heels. Laura and Harry Clark purchased the property from Jean in 1996.  Harry Clark died in 2012, and Laura continues to operate the theatre and diner. The Cherry Bowl offers mini-golf and double feature films rated PG-13 or below. Harry Clark installed sculptures next to the theater's vintage speakers and 14-foot neon hot dog. One sculpture is a pink and blue Volkswagen with a clown head on it, another is a pink cow with cherries for spots, and there is classic Chevy positioned to look like it is coming through a fence.

Fare
Food offerings include Messy Marvin's chili cheese fries sometimes and caramel apples made daily.

Gallery

See also

Cherry Hut
 List of drive-in theaters

References

Further reading

External links
 Cherry Bowl Drive In

1953 establishments in Michigan
Buildings and structures in Benzie County, Michigan
Cinemas and movie theaters in Michigan
Drive-in theaters in the United States
Restaurants in Michigan
Tourist attractions in Benzie County, Michigan
Diners in Michigan